Minneapolis is often considered one of the top biking and walking cities in the United States due to its vast network of trails and dedicated pedestrian areas. In 2020, Walk Score rated Minneapolis as 13th highest among cities over 200,000 people. Some bicycling ratings list Minneapolis at the top of all United States cities, while others list Minneapolis in the top ten. The network of shared biking and walking paths continued to grow into the late 2010s with the additions of the Hiawatha LRT Trail gap remediation, Min Hi Line pilot projects, and Samatar Crossing. The city also features several natural-surface hiking trails, mountain-biking paths, groomed cross-country ski trails in winter, and other pedestrian walkways.

Shared-use/mixed-use paths 
Minneapolis includes a number of shared-use or mixed-use paths, which are separate from a roadway, and they support multiple recreation and transportation opportunities, such as bicycling, walking, inline skating, roller skiing, and people in wheelchairs. In the U.S. state of Minnesota, shared-use path standards in are set by Administrative Rules, chapter 8820.9995. The Minnesota Department of Transportation also provides guidance for the design of shared-use paths.

This list includes notable shared-use paths in the city limits of Minneapolis, either whole or in part, and excludes roadway-only bike lanes, hiking-only trails, and mountain bike routes:

Grand Rounds National Scenic Byway system

Paths along parkways 
Memorial and Webber Parkways—
 Wirth Parkway—
 Dean Parkway—
 William Berry Parkway—
 Minnehaha Creek—
 Godfrey Parkway—
 West River and James I. Rice Parkways—
 East River Parkway—approximately 
 St. Anthony Parkway—
 Stinson Parkway—
 Ridgeway Parkway—

Paths around lakes 
 Lake Nokomis—
 Lake Harriet—
 Bde Mka Ska—
 Lake of the Isles—
 Cedar Lake—

City, county, and park board paths 

 Cedar Lake Trail—
 Diagonal Trail— in Minneapolis from city limits to Broadway Street Northeast
 Dinkytown Greenway—
 Hiawatha LRT Trail—
 Kenilworth Trail—
 Lake Hiawatha— 
 Little Earth Trail—
 Loring Greenway— 
 Luce Line Trail— in Minneapolis from Xerxes Avenue North to North Morgan Avenue
Nokomis-Minnesota River Regional Trail—
The Mall Park— of a linear park with paved multi-use paths near Lake of the Isles 
 Midtown Greenway, including Martin Olav Sabo Bridge over Hiawatha Avenue—
 Min Hi Line—approximately  when complete
 Minnehaha Trail—
 Samatar Crossing— 
 Southwest LRT Trail— from France Avenue to the Midtown Greenway/Kenilworth Trail intersection
 St. Anthony Falls Heritage Trail —

Bridges over the Mississippi River with paths 
List of bridges over the Mississippi River with bicycle and pedestrian paths:
 Ford Parkway Bridge—
 Franklin Avenue Bridge—
 Lake Street-Marshall Bridge—
 Lowry Avenue Bridge—
 Northern Pacific Bridge Number 9—
 Plymouth Avenue Bridge—
 Short Line Bridge proposed extension of the Midtown Greenway—
 Stone Arch Bridge—
 Third Avenue Bridge—
 Washington Avenue Bridge—

Hiking trails 
List of natural-surface hiking trails in Minneapolis:
Nicollet Island/Boom Island Trails— loop trail
Minnehaha Falls Lower Glen Trail—, hiking-only trail in Minnehaha Park along the creek
Theodore Wirth Park—features a network of mountain biking and hiking trails
Winchell Trail—, hiking-only trail along the Mississippi River gorge

Cross-country ski trails 
List of cross-country ski trails in Minneapolis, which are groomed in winter when there is sufficient snowfall conditions:

 Chain of Lakes—
 Cedar Lake Park—
 Cedar Lake and West Cedar Lake—
 Kenilwirth Channel—
 Lake of the Isles—
 Bde Maka Ska—
 Columbia Golf Course—
 Hiawatha Golf Course—
 Theodore Wirth Regional Park—, a portion of which is snowmaking trails

Pedestrian pathways and walking areas
List of pedestrian pathways and walking areas in Minneapolis:
Eloise Butler Wildflower Garden/Theodore Wirth Wildflower Trail— trail and garden walkway
Lake Harriet/Lyndale Rose Garden and Peace Park— of paved walkways
Minneapolis Sculpture Garden— with pedestrian-only paths
Minneapolis Skyway System—network of enclosed pedestrian footbridges totaling 
Milwaukee Avenue Historic District—houses sit along a bike- and pedestrian-friendly mall on which motor traffic is prohibited
 Nicollet Mall—a 12-block pedestrian and transit mall downtown with occasional bike use allowed
List of former pedestrian areas in Minneapolis:

 George Floyd Square—occupied protest of 38th Street and Chicago Avenue in 2020 and 2021 that closed the street to vehicular traffic

Long-distance trails 
List of long-distance trails in Minneapolis:
Mississippi River Trail (MRT)—the  cycling and pedestrian route from Lake Itasca, Minnesota to Venice, Louisiana, appropriates portions of the Grand Rounds National Scenic Byway trail system and Minnehaha Trail in Minneapolis.

See also 
Cycling in Minnesota
List of lakes in Minneapolis
List of streets in Minneapolis
Nice Ride Minnesota

References

External links 
 All Trails: Minneapolis
 Minneapolis Park and Recreation Board: Grand Rounds map
 Minneapolis Park and Recreation Board: Trails and Parkways
 Minneapolis Park and Recreation Board: Pedestrian and Bike Trail Distances

Minneapolis
Shared-use paths in Minneapolis
Transportation in Minneapolis–Saint Paul
Transportation in Hennepin County, Minnesota
Transportation in Minneapolis
Transportation in Minnesota
Bike paths in Minnesota
Rail trails in Minnesota